The Mexican state of Nuevo León has been governed by more than a hundred individuals in its history, who have had various titles and degrees of responsibility depending on the prevailing political regime of the time.

Under the current regime, executive power rests in a governor, who is directly elected by the citizens, using a secret ballot, to a six-year term with no possibility of reelection. The position is open only to a Mexican citizen by birth, at least 30 years old with at least five years of residency in Nuevo León.

The governor's term begins on October 4 and finishes six years later on October 3. Elections occur 3 years before/after presidential elections.

Nuevo Reino de León
 Luis Carvajal y de la Cueva, 1580–1588
 Diego de Montemayor, 1588–1610
 Diego de Montemayor (el mozo), 1610–1611
 Diego Rodríguez, 1612–1614
 Agustín de Zavala, 1614–1625

 Martín de Zavala, 1625–1664
 León de Alza, 1665–1667
 Nicolás de Azcárraga, 1667–1676
 Domingo de Prudena, 1676–1681
 Blas de la Garza y Falcón, 1681
 Domingo de Videgaray y Zarza, 1681
 Francisco de la Calancha y Valenzuela, 1681
 Blas de la Garza Falcón, 1681
 Juan de Echeverría, 1681–1682
 Diego de Villarreal, 1682–1683
 Alonso de León, 1683–1684
 Antonio de Echevérez y Subiza, 1684–1687
 Francisco Cuervo y Valdés, 1687–1688
 Pedro Fernández de la Ventosa, 1688–1693
 Juan Pérez de Merino, 1693–1698
 Juan Francisco de Vergara y Mendoza 1698–1703
 Francisco Báez Treviño, 1703–1705
 Gregorio de Salinas Varona, 1705–1707
 Cipriano García de Pruneda, 1707–1708
 Luis García de Pruneda 1708–1710
 Francisco Mier y Torre, 1710–1714
 Francisco Báez Treviño 1714–1718
 Juan Ignacio Flores Mogollón 1718
 Francisco de Barbadillo y Vitoria, 1719–1723
 Juan José de Arriaga y Brambila, 1723–1725
 Pedro de Sarabia Cortés, 1725–1729
 Bernardino de Meneses Monroy y Mendoza, 1730–1731
 Juan Antonio Fernández de Jáuregui y Urrutia, 1731–1740
 Pedro del Barrio Junco y Espriella, 1740–1746
 Vicente Bueno de Borbolla, 1746–1751
 Pedro del Barrio Junco y Espriella, 1752–1757
 Juan Manuel Muñoz de Villavicencio, 1757–1762
 Carlos de Velasco, 1762–1764
 Ignacio Ussel y Guimbarda, 1764–1772
 Francisco de Echegaray, 1772–1773
 Melchor Vidal de Lorca y Villena, 1773
 Vicente González de Santianes, 1773–1788
 Manuel Bahamonde y Villamil, 1788–1795
 Simón de Herrera y Leyva, 1795–1810
 Manuel de Santa María, 1810–1811
 José Santiago Villarreal, 1811
 Blas José Gómez de Castro, 1811–1813
 Ramón Díaz Bustamante, 1813
 José Antonio Mujica, 1814
 Froilán de Mier y Noguera, 1815
 Francisco Bruno Barreda, 1816 and 1818–1821
 Bernardo Villamil, 1817–1818

Independent Mexico

 Juan de Echandía 1822
 Francisco de Mier y Noriega, 1823
 José Antonio Rodríguez, 1824
 José María Parás, 1825–1827
 Manuel Gómez Castro, 1827–1829 
 Joaquín García, 1829–1833
 Manuel Gómez Castro, 1833
 Manuel María de Llano, 1833–1834
 Juan Nepomuceno de la Garza y Evía, 1835–1837 
 Joaquín García, 1837–1839
 Manuel María de Llano, 1839–1845
 José María Ortega, 1841
Juan Nepomuceno de la Garza y Evía, 1845–1846
 Pedro de Ampudia, 1846
 José María Parás, 1848–1850
Pedro de Ampudia, 1853–1854
 Pedro José García, 1850–1851
Agapito García Dávila, 1851–1853
 Mariano Morret, 1854
 Jerónimo Cardona, 1854–1855
 Santiago Vidaurri, 1855–1859
José Silvestre Aramberri, 1859
Santiago Vidaurri, 1860–1864

French intervention

Jesús María Benítez y Pinillos, 1864
 Mariano Escobedo, 1865
 Simón de la Garza Melo, 1865
 Mariano Escobedo, 1866
Manuel Z. Gómez, 1866–1867

Restored Republic

 Jerónimo Treviño, 1867–1869
 Simón de la Garza Melo, 1869
 Lázaro Garza Ayala, 1869
 José Eleuterio González, 1870
 Jerónimo Treviño; 1871, 1877 and 1913
 Genaro Garza García, 1871
 Lázaro Garza Ayala, 1872
 Narciso Dávila, 1872
 José Eleuterio González, 1872–1873
 Ramón Treviño, 1873
 José Eleuterio González, 1874
 Ramón Treviño, 1874
 Francisco González Doria, 1874
 Carlos Fuero, 1875–1876
 Narciso Dávila, 1876
 Canuto García, 1876
 Genaro Garza García 1876

Porfiriato 

 Genaro Garza García, 1877–1879
 Viviano L. Villareal, 1879–1881
 Genaro Garza García, 1881–1883
 Canuto García, 1883–1885
 Genaro Garza García, 1885
 Bernardo Reyes; 1885–1887, 1889–1900, and 1903–1909
 Lázaro Garza Ayala, 1887–1889
 Pedro Benítez Leal, 1900–1902
 José María Mier, 1909–1910

Mexican Revolution 

Leobardo Chapa, 1910–1911
 Viviano L. Villarreal, 1911–1913
 Salomé Botello, 1913–1914
 Antonio de la Paz Guerra, 1914
 Antonio L. Villarreal, 1914–1915
 Rafael Cepeda de la Fuente, 1915
 Felipe Ángeles, 1915
 Raúl Madero, 1915
 Ildefonso V. Vázquez, 1915
 Pablo A. de la Garza, 1915 and 1916
 Diódoro de la Garza, 1916
 Alfredo Recaut, 1917

Constitution of 1917

 Nicéforo Zambrano, 1917–1919
 José E. Santos, 1919–1920
 Humberto Barros, 1920
 Felix G. Lozano, 1920
 Porfirio G. González, 1920 and 1923–1925
 Juan M. García, 1921
 Leocadio M. González, 1922
 Ramiro Támez, 1922 and 1923
 Pedro Guajardo, 1923
 Alfredo Pérez, 1923
 Anastacio Treviño Martínez, 1923
 José Juan Vallejo, 1923
 Jerónimo Siller, 1925–1927
 José Benítez, 1928
 Plutarco Elías Calles (son), National Revolutionary Party, PNR, 1929 
 Generoso Chapa Garza, PNR, 1929
 Aarón Sáenz, PNR, 1927 and 1929–1931
 Francisco A. Cárdenas, PNR, 1931–1933
 Pablo Quiroga, PNR, 1933–1935
 Ángel Santos Cervantes, PNR, 1935
 Gregorio Morales Sánchez, PNR, 1935–1936
 Anacleto Guerrero Guajardo, PNR, 1936–1939
 Bonifacio Salinas Leal, Party of the Mexican Revolution, PRM, 1939–1943
 Arturo B. de la Garza, PRM, 1943–1949
 Ignacio Morones Prieto  1949–1952
 José S. Vivanco  1952–1955
 Raúl Rangel Frías  1955–1961
 Eduardo Livas Villarreal  1961–1967
 Eduardo Elizondo  1967–1971
 Luis M. Farías  1971–1973
 Pedro Zorrilla Martínez  1973–1979
 Alfonso Martínez Domínguez  1979–1985
 Jorge Treviño  1985–1991
 Sócrates Rizzo  1991–1995
 Benjamín Clariond  1995–1997
 Fernando Canales  1997–2003
 Fernando Elizondo  2003 (interim)
 José Natividad González Parás  2003–2009
 Rodrigo Medina de la Cruz  2009–2015
Jaime "El Bronco" Rodríguez Calderón, Independent (2015–2017)
Manuel Florentino González Flores, Independent, interim governor (2018)
Jaime "El Bronco" Rodríguez Calderón, Independent (2018–2021)
Samuel Alejandro García Sepúlveda  (2021–present).

References

Footnotes

Citations

Sources 
This article originated as a translation of the corresponding article in the Spanish-language Wikipedia. That, in turn, gives the following sources:
La Enciclopedia de los Municipios de México: Nuevo León
Israel Cavazos: Breve historia de Nuevo León

External links

Nuevo León
1580 establishments in the Spanish Empire